Noxal surrender was a provision of Roman law when a delict was brought against a paterfamilias for a wrong committed by a son or slave.  The defendant had the option in that instance of surrendering the dependant rather than paying the full damages.

References 

Roman law
Delict